Abiodun Olugbemiga Obafemi (born 25 December 1973 in Lagos) is a Nigerian former professional footballer. He is a defender who played most of his career in Germany, and was part of Nigeria's Gold Medal winning team at the 1996 Olympics.

References

External links
 

Living people
1973 births
Yoruba sportspeople
Sportspeople from Lagos
Association football defenders
Nigerian footballers
Olympic footballers of Nigeria
Olympic gold medalists for Nigeria
Footballers at the 1996 Summer Olympics
SC Fortuna Köln players
Fortuna Düsseldorf players
SSV Reutlingen 05 players
Toulouse FC players
FC Augsburg players
Bundesliga players
Olympic medalists in football
Medalists at the 1996 Summer Olympics